Brian Donnelly (born 1961) was a Northern Irish hurler who played as a full-forward for the Antrim senior team.

Donnelly made his first appearance for the team during the 1978-79 National League and was a regular member of the starting fifteen for over a decade. During that time he won two All-Ireland "B" medals and two Ulster medals.

At club level Donnelly enjoyed a lengthy career with the McQuillans, Ballycastle club.

References

1961 births
Living people
Ballycastle McQuillan hurlers
Antrim inter-county hurlers
Ulster inter-provincial hurlers